Richmond is a city in Cache County, Utah, United States. The population was 2,733 at the 2020 census. It is included in the Logan metropolitan area.

History
Agrippa Cooper was the first settler in Richmond in the mid-1850s. In 1859, surveyors visited the Richmond area and determined it to be a suitable area for living, with abundant water that could be used for farming and milling, and land that was fertile for growing crops. Within a few years log cabins, dugouts, and a log fort had been built. In 1860, a sawmill and a schoolhouse were erected. The city was settled mainly by Mormon pioneers, such as John Bair, Stillman Pond, Goudy E. Hogan, Thomas Levi Whittle, and Marriner W. Merrill.

In 1860, LDS Church President Brigham Young visited the settlement of Richmond to council and direct the settlement. The Native Americans in the Cache Valley were becoming hostile to many of the Mormon pioneers, and many violent battles had already been fought. Young counseled the settlers to "Move your families and wagons close together, then, if you are disturbed, you are like a hive of bees, and everyone is ready and knows at once what to do." This led the settlers to build a fort named "Fort Richmond". 

The city was likely named in honor of LDS apostle Charles C. Rich, though it may also have been named for the rich local soil or for Richmond, London, the hometown of some of its English settlers. Richmond was incorporated in 1868.

In 1912, an election was held about adding a Carnegie library. The Richmond Carnegie Library was built on Main Street in 1914.

Holstein Friesian cattle were brought to Richmond in 1904, and thrived so well that the town was recognized as Utah's Holstein center. In 1912, the Richmond Holstein Cow Show was founded. Now called Richmond's "Black and White Days", the show features carnival rides, food vendors, and a horse pull parade. The creameries were absorbed by Utah Condensed Milk Company in 1904, and then reorganized as Sego Milk Products in 1920. For many years, the plant was the largest operation west of the Mississippi.

The 1962 Cache Valley earthquake, which occurred east of Richmond in the Bear River Range, destroyed many pioneer buildings in Richmond, including the original home of Marriner W. Merrill, and the two-story LDS brick Stake Tabernacle.

The hillside letters "NC" (for "North Cache") are visible on a mountainside east of Richmond at

Geography

Climate
This climatic region is typified by large seasonal temperature differences, with hot summers and cold (sometimes severely cold) winters.  According to the Köppen Climate Classification system, Richmond has a dry-summer humid continental climate, abbreviated "Dsa" on climate maps.

Demographics

As of the census of 2000, there were 2,051 people, 619 households, and 526 families residing in the city. The racial makeup of the city was 97.32% White, 0.20% African American, 0.15% Native American, 0.20% Asian, 1.56% from other races, and 0.59% from two or more races. Hispanic or Latino of any race were 2.49% of the population.

There were 619 households, out of which 49.9% had children under the age of 18 living with them, 73.5% were married couples living together, 8.1% had a female householder with no husband present, and 14.9% were non-families. 13.7% of all households were made up of individuals, and 6.9% had someone living alone who was 65 years of age or older. The average household size was 3.31 and the average family size was 3.68.

In the city, the population was spread out, with 37.3% under the age of 18, 9.9% from 18 to 24, 25.5% from 25 to 44, 19.2% from 45 to 64, and 8.1% who were 65 years of age or older. The median age was 27 years. For every 100 females, there were 98.2 males. For every 100 females age 18 and over, there were 98.5 males.

The median income for a household in the city was $42,138, and the median income for a family was $45,500. Males had a median income of $31,743 versus $21,778 for females. The per capita income for the city was $14,312. About 5.8% of families and 6.7% of the population were below the poverty line, including 6.8% of those under age 18 and 7.7% of those age 65 or over.

Economy
Notable businesses Casper's Ice Cream, Cherry Peak Resort, and Lower Food are located in Richmond. Goldfish crackers are produced at a Pepperidge Farm facility in Richmond. In 2011, the plant was producing over 1 million cases of Goldfish.

The Richmond city website links to several local businesses, including Rockhill Creamery, My Favorite Gun Store, and Rezzimax.

Arts and culture

Richmond Relief Society Hall and Richmond Tithing Office are museums in Richmond. 

Multiple history articles have been produced about Richmond. The History of Richmond, Utah by Amos W. Bair, 1976; Richmond: A History in Black & White by Marlin W. Stum, 2007; Images of America: Richmond by Cheri Housley, Marie Lundgreen and Kathy Jones, 2011; Richmond's Encyclopedia website by Bryce Holt, launched 2021 with monthly updates. All can be found in the Richmond City Library.

Parks and recreation 
Parks and recreational sites include Richmond City Grandstand and Baseball Field, a public horse arena with benches, an outdoor shooting range, and the Richmond Community Building. The city, partnering with the Cache County Planning & Zoning commission, have begun the process of laying out paths and trails across the city and surrounding area.

Mount Naomi Wilderness, within the Uinta-Wasatch-Cache National Forest, is located east of Richmond.

Education 
Education in Richmond is over the Cache School District, with White Pine Elementary School on the north side of Richmond. All 7th and 8th grade students in the north end of Cache School District attend North Cache Middle School, and advance to Sky View High School.

Media
In 1971, Richmond resident Arthur Morin and 11 of his children drove 2,700 miles (4,300 km) in a camper to Lehigh Acres, Florida, to compete as finalists in the All American Family competition.

In 2003, part of the film Napoleon Dynamite was filmed in Richmond's Big J's fast-food restaurant.

In 2006, Richmond resident Sue Morgan was the first woman from Utah to compete in the Iditarod Trail Sled Dog Race.

In 2020, the Rezzimax Pain Tuner Pro, invented in Richmond, was named "Coolest Thing Made In Utah".

Notable people
Stillman Pond, farmer, harness maker, and member of the Second Quorum of Seventy of The Church of Jesus Christ of Latter-day Saints.
Thomas Levi Whittle, Mormon pioneer and early settler of Richmond.
Marriner W. Merrill and son Joseph F. Merrill, both members of the Quorum of the Twelve Apostles of the Church of Jesus Christ of Latter-day Saints.
Herschel Bullen, businessman, politician and leader in the Church of Jesus Christ of Latter-day Saints.
William Jasper Kerr, chancellor of Oregon University System and president of Oregon State University, Brigham Young College, and Utah State Agricultural College.
 Paula Hawkins, U.S. senator from Florida; attended high school in Richmond.
 Israel Keyes, serial killer.
Clarence L. Funk and brother James W. Funk, both served in Utah's 2nd State Senate district.
Dean Detton, American Professional Wrestler.
Harrison T. Groutage, Artist and professor at Utah State University.
Musician Leroy Robertson taught music at North Cache High School in Richmond.

See also

 List of cities and towns in Utah
 Bear River Massacre

References

External links

 

Cities in Cache County, Utah
Cities in Utah
Logan metropolitan area
Populated places established in 1859
1859 establishments in Utah Territory